A list of crime films released in the 1950s.

References

Crime films

1950s